Paradis (French for Paradise) is a Charleroi Metro station, located in Fontaine-l'Évêque, in fare zone 2. The eastern end of the station is at ground level, while the western end is on a viaduct. The station is accessed through escalators and stairs at the western end of the central platform.

The name of the station comes from the Rue du Paradis (Paradise street) where it is located.

Nearby points of interest 
The station serves the southeastern part of Fontaine-l'Évêque, and the northeastern part of Leernes.

Transfers  
There are no direct bus transfers at the station, although a stop of TEC Charleroi bus lines 63 is located nearby.

Charleroi Metro stations
Railway stations opened in 1983